Vereshchaginsky District is an administrative district (raion) of Perm Krai, Russia; one of the thirty-three in the krai. Municipally, it is incorporated as Vereshchaginsky Municipal District. It is located in the west of the krai. Its administrative center is the town of Vereshchagino. Population:  The population of Vereshchagino accounts for 53.5% of the district's total population.

Geography
The Lysva River (a tributary of the Obva) flows through the district, dividing it into two almost equal parts.

History
The district was established on January 1, 1924.

Demographics
The most numerous ethnic groups, according to the 2002 Census, include Russians at 94.9%, Udmurts at 2%, and Komi-Permyak people at 1.1%.

Economy
Manufacture of plastics and knitwear, as well as food and timber industry and agriculture, are developed in the district.

See also
Zakharyata

Notable residents 

Yevgeny Obukhov (1921–1944), Red Army sergeant, Hero of the Soviet Union, born in the village of Malga

References

Notes

Sources

Districts of Perm Krai